André Filipe Lopes Almeida (born 16 May 1995) is a Portuguese professional footballer who plays for Académico de Viseu F.C. as a central defender.

Club career
Formed at C.F. Os Belenenses, Almeida was born in Massamá, Lisbon District, and was successively loaned to begin his senior career, starting at AD Oeiras in the regional leagues but moving straight to the Segunda Liga with Clube Oriental de Lisboa. He made his professional debut with the latter club on 25 February 2015, coming on as a 58th-minute substitute in a 3–0 home win against FC Porto B.

In the 2017 January transfer window, Almeida cut ties with Belenenses and signed with FC Stumbras in the Lithuanian A Lyga. In his first season, he won the domestic cup.

Match fixing scandal
On 26 May 2016, Almeida was arrested on suspicion of match fixing whilst at Oriental, which led to him being banned from playing professional football in Portugal.

References

External links

Portuguese League profile 

1995 births
Living people
Sportspeople from Lisbon District
Portuguese footballers
Association football defenders
Liga Portugal 2 players
Campeonato de Portugal (league) players
Real S.C. players
C.F. Os Belenenses players
AD Oeiras players
Clube Oriental de Lisboa players
S.C. Covilhã players
Académico de Viseu F.C. players
A Lyga players
FC Stumbras players
Portuguese expatriate footballers
Expatriate footballers in Lithuania
Portuguese expatriate sportspeople in Lithuania